The Roman Catholic Diocese of Kumbo is a Roman Catholic diocese in the Ecclesiastical Province of Bamenda in Cameroon. The first German settlers were Missionaries of the Sacred Heart who arrived in 1912 and established their mission in 1913. The Diocese of Kumbo was erected by Pope John Paul II on Thursday, 18 March 1982, with territory taken from the then Diocese (now Archdiocese) of Bamenda. It is a suffragan diocese of the Metropolitan See of Bamenda along with the Roman Catholic Dioceses of Buea, Kumba (not to be confused with Kumbo), and Mamfe.

The Diocese of Kumbo is made up of two civil administrative units, namely, Bui and Donga-Mantung Divisions in the North West Region of the Republic of Cameroon. Bui Division is further divided into 6 subdivisions: Kumbo Central, Jakiri, Oku, Mbven, Nkum and Noni, while Donga-Mantung Division is divided into 5 subdivisions, viz: Nkambe Central, Ndu, Ako, Misaje and Nwa.

The territory of Bui and Donga-Mantung Divisions situated in the Bamenda grassfields area of the North West Region of Cameroon covers a surface area of 8,000 square kilometers (3,090 square miles) with a population of approximately 789,000 of whom over 202,543 (25.7%) are Catholics. There are 11 ethnic groups: Nso’ tribe, the Oku tribe and the Noni tribe in Bui Division, and the Wimbum, Mbembe, Jukum, Nchanti, Mfumte, Yamba, Mbaw and Mambila tribes in Donga-Mantung Division. Each of these tribes has its own language and dialects.

Considering the fact that the average annual population growth is about 2.36%, the total population of the diocese has grown from 653,244 in 1998 to 734,052 in 2003. Since the area of the territory is about 8,000 km2, the population density is about 92 people per km2. This is one of the densely populated Catholic dioceses in Cameroon.

Religious Data

There are three main religious groups in the Diocese of Kumbo, namely, the Christians, the Muslims and the adherents of the African Traditional Religion. The present statistics reveal that the adherents of the African Traditional Religion are still the majority, followed by the Christians in the second place and then the Moslems. The Christians are further regrouped into Catholics, Presbyterians, Baptists and some Evangelical and Pentecostal Communities like the Churches of Christ and the Deeper Life Church. The population of this latter group is very insignificant, made up mainly of drop-outs from the other Christian groups.

The Catholic Population

The Catholic population has continued to grow steadily, with an average of about 4,140 baptisms per year, and about 5,429 catechumens per year.

The Protestant Population

There are no available statistics from the main Protestant Churches, namely, the Presbyterian Church in Cameroon (PCC) and the Cameroon Baptist Convention (CBC).

The evangelical groups, like the Churches of Christ and Deeper Life Church, which can be considered as sects, recruit their followers from the mainline Protestant Churches. They are very active among students and young people.

Islam

There are also no available statistics about the Muslims. In the Kumbo urban area there are two Islamic secondary schools and a Teacher Training College.

The Moslem population is made up of the traditionally Islamic tribes, the Hausa people, the Fulanis and the Wodaabe or the Bororo people, who are mostly grazers, and those from the local tribes who have been Islamized. The greater bulk of this category and of the Moslems in general is found among the Nso Tribe. They win some of their converts, especially women, through marriage and by giving cows as bait to the young people who want to get rich overnight.

The African Religions

The adherents of the African Religions still constitute the bulk of the population. As with Islam, there are no statistics about them.

Pastoral Zones and Special churches
The cathedral is Saint Therese of the Child Jesus Cathedral in Kumbo. Below is a full list of Deaneries and Parishes in the two civil administrative units that make up the Diocese of Kumbo.

Bui Division

Kumbo Deanery 	

 Saint Theresia Cathedral Parish, Kumbo
 Immaculate Conception Parish, Tobin
 Immaculate Conception Parish, Kikaikelaki
 Saints Peter and Paul Parish, Kikaikom
 Saint Jude Parish, Mbve
 Saint Michael Parish, Meluf
 Saint Kizito Parish, Melim
 Sacred Heart Parish, Shisong

Tatum Deanery

 Assumption Parish, Mbiame
 Saint Joseph Parish, Ndzevru
 Saint John the Baptist Parish, Ngondzen
 Saint Pius X Parish, Tatum

Nkar Deanery

 Christ the King Parish, Jakiri
 Saint Mary Parish, Nkar
 Saint Therese of the Child Jesus’ Parish, Sop

Djottin Deanery

 Saint Joseph Parish, Djottin
 Saint John the Baptist Parish, Elak-Oku
 Saint Patrick Parish, Nkor

Donga-Mantung Division

Tabenken Deanery

 Holy Family Parish, Tabenken
 Saint Martin de Porres Parish, Ndu
 Saints Peter and Paul Parish, Ngarum
 Our Lady of Fatima Parish, Mfumte
 Saint Kizito Parish, Sabongari

Nkambe Deanery	

 Saint Mathias Mulumba Parish, Ako
 Saint Martin de Porres Parish, Binju - Nkambe
 Saint John Parish, Misaje
 Christ the King Parish, Nkambe Town

Bishops

Bishops of Kumbo (Roman rite), in reverse chronological order
Bishop George Nkuo (since 8 July 2006)
Bishop Cornelius Fontem Esua (10 September 1982  – 7 December 2004), appointed Coadjutor Archbishop of Bamenda

Other priest of this diocese who became bishop
Agapitus Enuyehnyoh Nfon, appointed Auxiliary Bishop of Bamenda in 2011

Governance

The diocese of Kumbo is led by
The Bishop
The Vicar-General
Two Episcopal Delegates or Vicars
The Vicar for Catechists
The Vicar for Laity
The Council of Priests
The Chairman for the Association of Diocesan Priests (ADP)
Additionally, there is a Presbyteral Council, various consultative Committees and Commissions and each Deanery has a Dean or a Vicar Forane.

Religious Communities

MALE CONGREGATIONS

Priests

Saint Joseph's Society for Foreign Missions, (Mill Hill Missionaries), MHM
Order of Friars Minor Capuchin, O.F.M. Cap
Congregation of the Priests of the Sacred Heart of Saint Quentin, SCJ
Order of the Poor Clerics Regular of the Mother of God of the Pious Schools or the Piarist Fathers, (Calasanzians), Sch. P
Missionary Sons of the Immaculate Heart of Mary - Claretian Missionaries (CMF)
Rogationists of the Heart of Jesus, RCJ

Brothers

The Marist Brothers of the Schools (FMS)

FEMALE CONGREGATIONS

Sisters
Tertiary Sisters of Saint Francis (TSSF)
Sisters of Saint Mary of Namur (SSMN)
Daughters of Our Lady of the Sacred Heart (FDNSC)
Missionary Sisters of the Immaculate Heart of Mary (ICM)
Sisters of the Congregation de Notre Dame de Montreal (CND)
Missionary Sisters of Our Lady of the Holy Rosary (MSHR)
Daughters of Our Lady on Mount Calvary, (FNSMC)

Sisters
Sisters of the Holy Union (SUSC)
Sisters of Saint Thérèse of the Child Jesus of Buea (SST)
Handmaids of the Holy Child Jesus, HHCJ
Sister of Saint Ann, SSA
Sisters Servants of the Holy Heart of Mary, SSCM
Sisters of Saint John the Baptist, SJB

Catholic Education

Vocational Training

Professional Education
Catholic School of Health Sciences, Shisong-Kumbo
Catholic University of Cameroon (CATUC)], Bamenda, Kumbo
Saint Pius X Teacher Training College, Tatum
Saint Pius X Technical Teacher Training College, Tatum

Formation in Pastoral Ministry
Saint Jerome Biblical and Pastoral Institute

Secondary Education

Catholic Schools and Colleges
Cardinal Tumi's Catholic Comprehensive College, Mantum-Jakiri
Our Lady of the Immaculate Conception College, Kumbo
Regina Pacis Comprehensive High School, Nkar
Saint Aloysius' Minor Seminary, Kitiwum - Kumbo
Saint Anthony of Padua's Comprehensive College, Mbohtong - Shisong
Saint Augustine's College, Nso
Saint Christopher's Catholic Evening School, Kumbo
Saint Francis' College, Shisong

Catholic Schools and Colleges
Saint John Bosco's Catholic Comprehensive College, Ngarum
Saint Joseph's Catholic Comprehensive College, Lassin-Nkor
Saint Peter's Catholic Comprehensive College, Kumbo
Saint Pius X's Catholic College, Tatum
Saint Rita's Technical High School, Nkambe
Saint Sylvester's Catholic Comprehensive High School, Sop
Saint Theresa's Comprehensive College, Djottin

Other services

The Diocese of Kumbo, in addition to the work within the 27 parishes, operates some services centrally. The best known of these are BEPHA (the Diocesan Service for Health Care), the Printing and Communication Centre (PCC), a Carpentry and Construction Department, a Mechanical and Technical Training Centre (MTTC) and the Catholic Book Centre (CABOC). The Diocese also operates Pilot Agricultural Training Projects at Mfumte, Mbiame and Misaje.

The Diocese is also runs the FACTS Project for Catholic schools and colleges. There are also outreach programmes for orphans and vulnerable children. The diocese is also home to Community Based Organization (CBO) programme for local communities and underprivileged children.

Gallery

See also
Roman Catholicism in Cameroon

References

External links

 
http://shisonghospital.org/wordpress/
http://kumbo-limburg.blogspot.it/
 Tertiary Sisters of St. Francis - Cameroon
http://shisonghospital.org/wordpress/wp-content/uploads/2011/04/Identity-of-the-Sisters-and-Hospital.pdf
http://shisonghospital.org/wordpress/cardiac-centre/the-archbishop-paul-verdzekov-memorial-heart-foundation/membership/
http://binjunkambe.wordpress.com/
http://binju-nkambe.blogspot.it/
 GCatholic.org
(This history of the Diocese of Kumbo is reproduced from: Firm in the Faith: 75 Anniversary of the Catholic Church in Kumbo diocese, printed by Grafiche Dehoniane Bologna in 1987, pp. 8 – 17).
Catholic School of Health Sciences, Shisong

Kumbo
Kumbo
Kumbo
1982 establishments in Cameroon
Roman Catholic Ecclesiastical Province of Bamenda